Sammy Amekudji (born 25 December 1939) is a Ghanaian boxer. He competed in the men's lightweight event at the 1964 Summer Olympics.

References

External links

1939 births
Living people
Ghanaian male boxers
Olympic boxers of Ghana
Boxers at the 1964 Summer Olympics
Place of birth missing (living people)
Lightweight boxers